Cheryl Bogart (born November 27, 1977) is an American music industry veteran and spinal cord injury awareness advocate.

Personal life 
Bogart was born in the Chicago suburb of Oak Park, Illinois and is of Russian, Polish and Italian descent. She spent her early life in Beverly Hills, CA and graduated from Good Shepherd Catholic School, followed by Beverly Hills High School.  Her higher learning continued at Wilbur Wright College and Santa Monica City College.  In her 20s she became business partners and married music executive and songwriter Evan Bogart. In October 2005, Bogart sustained an incomplete spinal cord injury as a result of a fall. She became a passionate advocate for spinal cord injuries, supporting research and cures for regenerative medicine and nanotechnology, while still maintaining her place in the music industry.

Family 
Bogart's brother, Phillip Scheid VI, was injured in a 1999 shooting by his childhood best friend, Scott Sterling, son of real estate mogul and former Los Angeles Clippers basketball team owner Donald Sterling. Reportedly the incident occurred after an argument between the two regarding actress Lindsey McKeon.

Career 

Bogart's career in the entertainment world began in her late teens, when she started scouting models, musicians and actors for No Limit Records. She was mentored by Elliot Roberts at Lookout Management, then went on to work for numerous record and management companies in Los Angeles and New York.

In 2002, Bogart helped then-business partner and husband, Evan Bogart, form Casbah Artists Management in tribute to Evan's deceased father and Casablanca Records founder, Neil Bogart. During that time, Cheryl inspired Evan and his producer J.R. Rotem to develop the all-girl trio, Raw Candy. The song SOS (Rescue Me), originally written for Raw Candy, eventually became a worldwide hit, popularized by the singer Rihanna.

Bogart went on to form her own management company, Spider Artists Management where she managed Casey Johnson, and, among others, Richard Grieco's band, Wasteland Park. In 2009, she signed The Green Children, a duo from the United Kingdom and Norway, to a two-album deal under her management company. During that same year, she took on the role as senior executive for Knightingale Entertainment, which is owned by The Green Children. Bogart secured a worldwide distribution deal for the group through Spinside Records, a subsidiary of Inside Recordings, which is owned by the legendary Jackson Browne. Bogart and The Green Children parted ways in 2011, and now she is focusing on creative production in television.

In addition to her work with Spider Artists Management, Bogart began writing a book in 2010 about the dark underbelly of Beverly Hills, including details of her association with real estate mogul and former L.A. Clippers basketball team owner Donald Sterling.

References

External links
 New Mobility Magazine
 Beluga Heights

1977 births
Living people
American music industry executives
American music managers
A&R people
People from Oak Park, Illinois
People with paraplegia